The Social Bases of Nazism, 1919–1933 is a 2003 non-fiction book written by Detlef Muehlberger.

References

2003 non-fiction books
History books about Nazi Germany